The Cavite Peninsula is a peninsula extending northeast into Manila Bay from the coastal town of Noveleta in Cavite province in the Philippines. The northern tip of the peninsula is geographically the northernmost part of the Province of Cavite.

The peninsula is composed of the City of Cavite with a tiny southern portion part of the Municipality of Noveleta. The northernmost portion of the peninsula, called Sangley Point, was the location of the former U.S. Naval Station Sangley Point until 1971 when it was turned over to the Philippine government. It is now called the Danilo Atienza Air Base, a Philippine Air Force base.



Geography 

The peninsula is shaped like a human left hand starting from about the middle of the forearm with fingers forming a letter 'C'. Cañacao Bay is the body of water formed by the C-shaped upper peninsula. The thumb area was the historic old Port City of Cavite, the sister city and main seaport of the City of Manila. Because of deeper waters than the Port of Manila that was then located along the banks of the Pasig River, the Port of Cavite became the staging and receiving area for the Manila galleon trade from 1565 to 1815.

The port city used to be an island connected by a causeway to Barangay San Roque as seen from the picture above and the map to the left. The land along the causeway was reclaimed in the late 1960s, and is now occupied by the San Sebastian College-Recoletos de Cavite. The tip of the thumb, known as the Cavite Punta or Cavite Point, was the location of the old Spanish shipyard where galleons were built. It later became Cavite Navy Yard during the American colonial rule.

Bacoor Bay is the enclosed body of water formed by the eastern shore of the peninsula, starting from the tip of the thumb (Cavite Point), circling to mainland Cavite province, continuing to the northern tip of Burunggoy Island (now Island Cove Hotel & Leisure Park).

Jurisdiction 
The present and larger Cavite City has jurisdiction over most of the peninsula. Only a tiny portion at the southernmost part belongs to Noveleta. Dalahican in Cavite City is the first settlement of the city from Noveleta while San Rafael IV is the last barangay of Noveleta.

San Rafael IV is separated from Santa Isabel of Kawit, by the Grande River (Rio Grande of Cavite), also known as the San Juan River (incorrectly named as Ylang-ylang River on Google Maps). The location of the mouth of the Grande River in Noveleta and where Kawit ends on the river, is technically the start of the peninsula, at the average tide level.

Northernmost point 
The northernmost point of the Cavite Peninsula is also the northernmost point of the Province of Cavite located at the northern tip of the Danilo Atienza Air Base (Sangley).

Accessibility 
Only one two-lane road, San Juan Road, connects the peninsula and its communities to mainland Cavite.

The trip, which started on August 20, 2007, takes about 40 minutes compared to about 2 to 2.5 hours by land.

External links 

Peninsulas of the Philippines
Landforms of Cavite
Cavite City